In geometry, the diminished rhombicosidodecahedron is one of the Johnson solids. It can be constructed as a rhombicosidodecahedron with one pentagonal cupola removed.

Related Johnson solids are:
 : parabidiminished rhombicosidodecahedron with two opposing cupolae removed, and
 : metabidiminished rhombicosidodecahedron with two non-opposing cupolae removed, and
 : tridiminished rhombicosidodecahedron with three cupola removed.

External links
 
 Editable printable net of a diminished rhombicosidodecahedron with interactive 3D view

Johnson solids